Julio César Chiarini (born 4 March 1982) is an Argentine retired football goalkeeper.

Honours
 
Guillermo Brown de Puerto Madryn
 Torneo Argentino A: 2007

River Plate
 Copa Sudamericana: 2014
 Recopa Sudamericana: 2015
 Copa Libertadores: 2015

References

External links
 statistics at BDFA 
 Statistics at Futbol360
 

Living people
1982 births
Argentine footballers
Association football goalkeepers
Argentine Primera División players
Primera Nacional players
Torneo Argentino A players
Guillermo Brown footballers
Instituto footballers
Huracán de Comodoro Rivadavia footballers
Club Atlético River Plate footballers
Club Atlético Tigre footballers
Club Atlético Sarmiento footballers
Sportspeople from Córdoba Province, Argentina